Benzamil or benzyl amiloride is a potent blocker of the ENaC channel and also a sodium-calcium exchange blocker. It is a potent analog of amiloride, and is marketed as the hydrochloride salt (benzamil hydrochloride). As amiloride, benzamil has been studied as a possible treatment for cystic fibrosis, although with disappointing results.

Structure
Benzamil is a benzyl group-containing analog of amiloride. Like amiloride, it is a guanidinium group-containing pyrazine derivative.

Mechanism of action

Benzamil is closely related to amiloride. By adding the benzyl group to the nitrogen of the guanidinium group the activity is increased several hundredfold.

Amiloride works by directly blocking the epithelial sodium channel (ENaC) thereby inhibiting sodium reabsorption in the distal convoluted tubules and collecting ducts in the kidneys (this mechanism is the same for triamterene). This promotes the loss of sodium and water from the body, but without depleting potassium.

References

External links

Potassium-sparing diuretics
Aminopyrazines
Acylguanidines